Superchip: The Final Silicon Solution? is the eighth and final album by the Edgar Broughton Band. This album saw them on their own record label, and were credited as The Broughtons as they were called on their previous album, Parlez-Vous English?. This album sees the band with a slightly different sound, with prominent use of synthesisers, but still retaining their original psychedelic rock roots. The album was originally released as "Sheet Records Sheet 2" in 1982. The 2006 CD reissue features one bonus track, which was an electronic dance track created by Edgar Broughton and his son, Luke Broughton.

Track listing
All tracks composed by Edgar Broughton; except where indicated
Side one
"Metal Sunday" - 2:15
"Superchip - The Final Silicon Solution" - 4:20
"Who Only Fade Away" - 2:22
"Curtain" (Edgar Broughton, Dennis Haynes) - 2:30
"Outrageous Behaviour" (Steve Broughton, Tom Nordon) - 2:53
"Not So Funny Farm" (Edgar Broughton, Tom Nordon) - 2:25
"Nighthogs" - 2:01
Side two
"Innocent Bystanders (Damian and Soola)" - 2:56
"Pratfall" (Edgar Broughton, Dennis Haynes) - 3:01
"O.D. 47600/1162/111800" (Steve Broughton) - 2:53
"Do You Wanna Be Immortal?" - 3:08
"Subway Information" - 1:47
"The Last Electioneer" (Edgar Broughton, Steve Broughton) - 2:45
"Goodbye Ancient Homeland" - 3:32

2006 CD reissue bonus track
"The Virus" (Edgar Broughton, Luke Broughton) - 17:13

Notes
The song "Innocent Bystanders (Damian and Soola)" contains a very strong reference to the previous album. During the track we hear the lyrics

"He's a second coming Nazi with a fancy little tartsie
He met her at the party on the last L.P."

This is a reference the first track on the previous album where a man meets a girl at a party.

Personnel
Edgar Broughton Band
Edgar Broughton - lead vocals, guitar, vocoder
Arthur Grant - bass guitar, vocals
Steve Broughton - drums, vocals, percussion, marimba
Duncan Bridgeman - keyboards
Dennis Haines - keyboards, piano, vocals
Tom Nordon - guitar, vocals
Luke Broughton - keyboards (bonus track)

1982 albums
Edgar Broughton Band albums